Events in the year 1902 in Norway.

Incumbents
Monarch: Oscar II
Prime Minister: Johannes Steen, then Otto Blehr

Events
15 November – The Ofoten Line opened.
23 November – The Valdres Line opened.
Oslo Police Museum is established.
The town of Victoriahavn changed its name to Narvik.

Popular culture

Sports

Football Association of Norway is founded.

Music

Film

Literature

Notable births

15 January – Olaug Hay, politician (died 2000)
24 January – Sigurd Lund Hamran, politician (died 1977)
30 January – Magnus Jensen, historian and educator (died 1990).
12 February – Henry Wilhelm Kristiansen, newspaper editor and politician (died 1942) 
25 February – Hans Berg, politician (died 1980)
15 March – Harald Hagen, sailor and Olympic gold medallist (died 1970)
3 April – Dagmar Maalstad, politician (died 2000)
4 April – Sverre Hope, politician (died 1966)
5 April – Olav Nielsen, boxer (died 1944)
6 April – Gustav Sjaastad, politician and Minister (died 1964)
12 April – Finn Øen, politician (died 1979)
18 April – Gulborg Nygaard, politician (died 1991)
24 April – Hans Struksnæs, sailor and Olympic silver medallist (died 1983)
25 April – Per Aabel, comic actor (died 1999)
28 April – Johan Borgen, author, journalist and critic (died 1979)
5 May – Johan Andersen, politician (died 1968)
21 May – Asbjørn Øye, politician (died 1998)
23 May – Lars Tangvik, politician (died 1991)
18 June – John Rognes, military officer (died 1949).
11 July - Rolf Wideröe, particle physicist (died 1996)
23 July - Kaare Strøm, limnologist (died 1967)
1 August - Peder Kjellberg, boxer (died 1975)
9 August - Anton Rønneberg, writer, theatre critic, dramaturg and theatre director (died 1989)
14 August – Otto Carlmar, film producer, writer and actor (died 1987)
18 August – Ole Bae, civil servant (died 1972)
2 September – Peter Torleivson Molaug, politician (died 1985)
16 September – Halvard Lange, diplomat, politician and Minister (died 1970)
1 October – Jon Snersrud, skier and Olympic bronze medallist (died 1986)
5 October – Vaadjuv Nyqvist, sailor and Olympic silver medallist (died 1961)
10 October – Sigurd Monssen, rower and Olympic bronze medallist (died 1990)
11 October – Bent Røiseland, politician (died 1981)
12 October – Bernt Ingvaldsen, politician (died 1985)
12 October – Finn Moe, politician (died 1971)
12 October – Steffen Ingebriktsen Toppe, politician (died 1979)
1 November – Nordahl Grieg, poet, novelist, dramatist, and journalist (died 1943)
8 November – Jørgen Holmboe, meteorologist (died 1979)
16 November – Hjalmar Hvam, Nordic skier and inventor of the first safety ski binding (died 1996)
25 November – Trygve Stokstad, boxer (died 1979)
13 December – Halfdan Olaus Christophersen, historian (died 1980).
22 December – Hartvig Svendsen, politician (died 1971)

Notable deaths

6 January – Lars Hertervig, painter (born 1830)
17 January – Elias Blix, poet, musician, politician and Minister (born 1836)
18 February – Hans Christian Harboe Grønn, barrister and politician (born 1829).
26 May – Jacob Otto Lange, politician and Minister (born 1833)
6 August – Oscar Jacobsen, engineer and politician (born 1850)
12 October – Jacob Andreas Michelsen, businessperson and politician (born 1821)
13 November – Sivert Christensen Strøm, jurist and politician (born 1819)

Full date unknown
Jon Eilevsson Steintjønndalen, Hardanger fiddle maker (born 1845)
Knut Eilevsson Steintjønndalen, Hardanger fiddle maker (born 1850)
 Sofie Parelius, actress (born 1823)

See also

References